Oberkirchen may refer to:

Places 
Oberkirchen (Freisen), is a locality in the municipality Freisen in Saarland, Germany
Oberkirchen (Schmallenberg), is a locality in the municipality Schmallenberg in North Rhine-Westphalia, Germany

See also 
Obernkirchen